Public News Service (usually shortened to PNS) was launched in 1996  by journalist Lark Corbeil in Idaho. Today, PNS has 38 state-based news services that provide multi-platform content for free to news outlets as a way to advocate journalism in the public interest.

History

Following the 1996 Telecommunications Act, which allowed for media cross-ownership, Corbeil founded Public News Service as an avenue to examine and reach rural areas.

In May 2017, Dan Heyman, a PNS producer in West Virginia, was arrested at the state capitol for asking former Health and Human Services Secretary Tom Price a question in an “aggressive manner.” Heyman was jailed and charged for willful disruption of state government processes. In September 2017, the misdemeanor charge against Heyman was dropped after “a careful review” by the Kanawha County prosecutor’s office.

In 2019, PNS, in collaboration with the Pacifica Foundation, developed "2020Talks," a daily three-minute newscast covering the 2020 election primaries, leading up to the Iowa Caucuses.

Funding

Public News Service, a certified B Corporation, is funded by grants, gifts, some media contributions, and memberships from individuals, foundations, non-profit organizations and socially responsibly businesses.

References

External Links 
 

Benefit corporations
1996 establishments in Idaho
Mass media companies established in 1996
Companies based in Boulder, Colorado
B Lab-certified corporations